Kenneth, Kenny or Ken Taylor may refer to:

Ken Taylor (cricketer, born 1916) (1916–2002), English cricketer
Ken Taylor (cricketer, born 1935), English cricketer and footballer for Huddersfield Town
Ken Taylor (New Zealand cricketer) (born 1953), New Zealand cricketer
Ken Taylor (footballer, born 1931) (1931–2016), English footballer for Blackburn Rovers
Ken Taylor (footballer, born 1936), footballer for Manchester City
Ken Taylor (American football) (born 1963), Chicago Bears defensive back
Ken Taylor (poet), Australian poet, see New South Wales Premier's Literary Awards
Ken Taylor (politician), Canadian politician and former leader of the Yukon Liberal Party
Ken Taylor (rugby union) (born 1957), New Zealand rugby union player
Ken Taylor (motor racing engineer), partner in Thomson & Taylor
Ken Taylor (scriptwriter) (1922–2011), television script writer best known for his adaptation of The Jewel in the Crown
Kenneth Alan Taylor (born 1937), British theatre director and pantomime dame
Kenneth Allen Taylor (1954–2019), American professor of philosophy at Stanford University; co-host of radio program Philosophy Talk
Kenneth D. Taylor (1934–2015), Canadian Ambassador to Iran during the Iran Hostage Crisis
Kenneth M. Taylor (1919–2006), American WWII pilot at Pearl Harbor
Kenneth N. Taylor (1917–2005), American publishing entrepreneur, best known as the creator of The Living Bible
Kenneth Taylor (footballer, born 2002), Dutch footballer
Kenny Taylor (basketball) (born 1982), American basketball player
A rosemary cultivar, Rosmarinus officinalis ‘Ken Taylor’